Rikhanikhal (also spelled Rikhnikhal) is a sub-Tehsil in the district Pauri Garhwal in the state of Uttarakhand. The sub-tehsil was created in the year 2016 and has 190 villages.

The economy of the area is dependent on agriculture and despite being located close to Corbett National Park , has very little tourism activities. It is a backward area with unreliable road connectivity. In October, 2022 there was a terrible accident that led to death of 32 people.

References 

Cities and towns in Pauri Garhwal district
Tehsils of India